The Journey of Flower is a 2015 Chinese television series starring Wallace Huo and Zhao Liying. It is based on the fictional novel of the same name written by Fresh Guoguo, which is inspired from Daoist legends regarding the path to immortality. The series was broadcast on Hunan TV every Wednesdays and Thursdays for two episodes per day, from 9 June to 7 September 2015.

Synopsis
Hua Qiangu (Zhao Liying) is an unlucky orphan born with a strange scent which attracts demons, and therefore is hated and feared by all the villagers. When she faced danger, she is saved by a man called Mo Bing, who is actually Bai Zihua in disguise. Bai Zihua (Wallace Huo) is a kind-hearted immortal who wants to protect all Earthly beings. The only heavenly tribulation in his life is actually Hua Qiangu, whom he is tasked to kill by his master. However, after witnessing her kind heart and foreseeing her tragic future, he spares her life.

In search of her benefactor, Hua Qiangu heads to Mount Chang Liu, a sect that trains their disciples into immortals. With the help of Bai Zihua, she passes through various trials to become his only disciple. As the two spend more time together, Hua Qiangu falls in love with her teacher. When Bai Zihua falls into danger, she embarked on a journey to retrieve the ten ancient artifacts in order to attain the Yanbing Jade that would save his life. This causes the Demon God to be revived.  The Demon God transfers all his power into her body afterwards, and Hua Qiangu falls into the world of Emptiness. She unleashes the Great Desolate Energy Force to become the new ruler of the Demons. Bai Zihua tries to steer her towards the righteous path, and comes to her side alone to accompany her. When Hua Qiangu realizes Bai Zihua's true feelings for her, she decided to let herself be killed by him to restore peace to the world.

After Hua Qiangu dies, Bai Zihua feels extremely remorseful. One of the three masters from Changliu, Mo Yan, decided to use the power of nature to exchange his life for hers and restored her. In the end, Bai Zihua decides to leave Changliu to take care of Hua Qiangu.

Cast

Main

 Wallace Huo as Bai Zihua
 Chang Liu's Sect Leader and the head of all immortals. He is tasked to protect the magical realm of Chang Liu. He appears to be outwardly cold and heartless, but he cares for Hua Qiangu deeply. However, he has to hide his emotions because of his sense of propriety.
 Zhao Liying as Hua Qiangu
 The last descendant of Goddess Nuwa. She has a unique scent on her body, which attracts demons. When she was born, she causes all the flowers around her to wilt, and therefore she was named "Thousand Bones of Flower". She comes to Chang Liu, and becomes Bai Zihua's only disciple. She is also the fated calamity of Bai Zihua.

Supporting

Chang Liu Sect 

 Shen Baoping as Reverend, previous sect leader of Chang Liu. Bai Zihua's teacher.
 Jiang Yiming as Mo Yan
 Chang Liu's Shi Zun, Bai Zihua's senior. He is a strict and unyielding man who protects Bai Zihua and dislikes Hua Qiangu. He died after sacrificing his life to revive Hua Qiangu after discovering her kindness.
 Miao Chi as Sheng Xiaomo
 Chang Liu's Ru Zun, Bai Zihua's junior. He kindly treated Hua Qiangu with concern as an elder.
 Hou Yehua as Tao Weng, head librarian of Chang Liu.
 Dong Chunhui as Luo Shiyi
 Mo Yan's senior disciple. He is a kind-hearted and fair man who helps protect Chang Liu. He likes Tang Bao.
 Li Hanyang as Li Meng
 Disciple of Chang Liu. Bai Zihua's attendant. He witnessed Bai Zihua going crazed and biting/kissing Hua Qiangu, and was later silenced by Mo Yan.
 Li Chun as Ni Mantian
 Princess of Penglai. Disciple of Luo Shiyi. She is a proud and haughty girl, and gets jealous when Hua Qiangu becomes Bai Zihua's disciple. She likes Shuo Feng, and is angered by his protectiveness toward Hua Qiangu. She died while trying to absorb the desolate force from Hua Qiangu.
 Bao Tianqi as Qing Shui
 Princess of Zhou Kingdom. She is a good friend of Hua Qiangu. She falls in love with Meng Xuanlang, and later left Chang Liu to stay with him. She was jealous of Meng Xuanlang's affections toward Hua Qiangu, and tried to prevent Tang Bao being saved. After Tang Bao's death, she lost her memories due to the guilt she felt and becomes a crazed woman.
 Xu Haiqiao as Meng Xuanlang
 Second prince of the Shu Kingdom, later the Emperor. He has no interest in court affairs, and becomes a special disciple of Chang Liu. He likes Hua Qiangu, and protects her when she is being bullied by fellow sect mates. Later, because of his kingdom, he has no choice but to leave Chang Liu. After Qing Shui lost her memories, he stays by her side to take care of her.
 Jiang Yang as Shuo Feng
 A highly skilled expert of unknown origins. Disciple of Luo Shiyi. His true identity is a jade fragment spirit, destined to assist Hua Qiangu in gathering 10 immortal devices. He likes Ni Mantian, despite going against her multiple times in order to protect Hua Qiangu.
 Zhang Zhengyan as Huo Xi, disciple of Sheng Xiaomo. He likes Wu Qingluo.
 Lu Jiyi as Wu Qingluo, disciple of Sheng Xiaomo. She likes Huo Xi.
 Gong Zhengnan as Zhu Ran 
 Son of Mo Yan and a demon from the Seven Murder Factions. In order to obtain the immortal devices, he manipulated Liu Xia using her love for him. After that, he was banished to the wild barrens as punishment.
 Lu Ziyi as Yin Youruo, daughter of Yin Hongyuan. Hua Qiangu's disciple.

Seven Murder Factions

 Ma Ke as Sha Qianmo
 Demon Lord of the Seven Murder Factions. He is said to be the most beautiful man of all six realms. He treated Hua Qiangu as a replacement for his deceased younger sister and dotes on her, but later falls in love with her and died trying to save Hua Qiangu from Savage territory.
 Ruan Weijing as Shan Chunqiu, custodian of Law. Sha Qianmo's most loyal follower.
 Wang Xiuze as Kuang Yetian, a demon adept at traps. Shan Chunqiu's loyal follower.
 Du Zheyu as Yin Shangpiao, Shan Chunqiu's disciple, who is planted as a spy at Chang Liu. He was killed by Ni Mantian.
 Li Shanyu as Buo Ruohua, a demon adept at using poisons. Shan Chunqiu's follower.
 Li Qian as Liu Xia, Sha Qianmo's deceased younger sister. She loves Zhu Ran, but was used by him, and later committed suicide out of sorrow.

Immortals and alliance of Chang Liu

 Jiang Xin as Xia Zixun
 1 of the 5 immortals, who is in charge of the Heavenly Court's spices. She has a one-sided love for Bai Zihua. She becomes crazed when Bai Zihua does not reciprocate her love, and turned into a demon. She died after transferring all of her energy to Bai Zihua.
 Yang Shuo as Tan Fan, 1 of the 5 immortals. He loves Xia Zixun, and later saves her life by sacrificing his.
 Zeng Hongchang as Wu Gou 
 1 of the 5 immortals, leader of Lotus City. He fell in love with Yun Ya, his fated calamity, and committed many murders to revenge her death.
 Qian Yongchen as Dong Hua
 1 of the 5 immortals. He felt guilty toward Dongfang Yuqing for accidentally killing his father, and stayed by his side to make amendments to him. He was later accidentally killed by Dongfang Yuqing while protecting Bai Zihua.
 Zhao Chulun as Wen Shufeng, sect leader of Yu Zhuo Peak.
 Yan Hanqing as Yin Hongyuan, sect leader of Tian Shan.
 Shi Jiantao as Luo Hedong, an immortal of Kun Lun Sect. Dongfang Yuqing's teacher.
 Li Jinzhe as Fei Yan, sect leader of Tai Bai. He was killed by Wu Guo as revenge for Yun Ya's death.

Mt Shu Sect

 Gao Hai as Yun Yin, Senior disciple of Mt Shu. He became the sect leader of Mt Shu after Hua Qiangu.
 Gao Jiang as Yun Yi
 Yun Yun's younger twin brother. He suffers a curse because he was not born as the first son. He betrayed Mt Shu and joined the Seven Murder Factions to restore his disfigured face. He committed suicide using the Pity Sword.
 Zhang Shuangli as Reverend Qingxu
 Previous sect leader of Mt Shu. He saved Hua Qiangu's life when she was young, and died after passing the sect leader position to Hua Qiangu.
 Dan Ni as Qing Feng, Elder of Mt Shu.
 Lin Yizheng as Qing Yang, Elder of Mt Shu.

Kingdom of Shu

 Kang Lei as Meng Xuancong 
 Meng Xuanlang's rebellious older brother. He was used by Seven Murder Factions because he wants to usurp the throne, and later killed by Shan Chunqiu.
 Na Jiacheng as Lie Xingyun, loyal general of the Shu kingdom.
 Li Qi as Emperor, Meng Xuanlang's father.

Penglai Island

 Liu Bo as Ni Qianzhang, Sect leader of Peng Lai, Ni Maintain's father. He is killed by Shan Chunqiu, and the blame was shifted to Hua Qiangu.
 Shen Xuewei as Jin Quan, Ni Mantian's uncle. He was killed by Ni Mantian after finding out she practiced forbidden martial arts.

Shao Bai Sect

 Wang Yehua as Yan Tingsha, Sect Leader of Shao Bai. She was killed by Wu Guo as revenge for Yun Ya's death.
 Yang Anqi as Wei Xi, disciple of Shao Bai.
 Shen Yu as Mei'er, Disciple of Shao Bai. Good friend of Yun Ya. She was killed by Wu Guo as revenge for Yun Ya's death.

Others

 Zhang Danfeng as Dongfang Yuqing
 Lord of Strange Decay. He possesses the ability to know everything from the past. He hates Bai Zihua for killing his father, and plans to use Hua Qiangu's special fate to plot against him. However, he fell in love with Hua Qiangu after getting to know her, and eventually died while protecting her from Mo Yan.
 An Yuexi as Tang Bao 
 A ginx worm originated from Strange Decay pavilion and formed by Hua Qiangu's blood. She changes into human form after she was agitated by Ni Mantian. She likes Luo Shiyi. 
 Li Cheng as Lu Qiao, loyal follower of Dongfang Yuqing. She died while helping Hua Qiangu to retrieve the ten ancient artifacts.
 Zheng Yecheng as Nan Xianyue
 Previous demon lord and leader of the Seven Murder Factions. He was rescued by Hua Qiangu when the 10 immortal devices are restored. Later, his death was faked with the help of Bai Zihua and he becomes an ordinary citizen.
 Sun Gelu as Yun Ya
 A palace maid at Lotus City. 
 Wu Gou's lover and fated calamity. She was abetted by her friend Mei'er to steal a treasure, and was killed by various sect leaders.
 Wang Jiusheng as Hua Qiangu's father. He died of illness.

Production
Fresh Guoguo, the writer of the novel, was recruited to be one of the scriptwriters of the drama. Academy-award nominee Chung Munhai, who was the costume designer of the movie Curse of the Golden Flower was also recruited on set. The 3D effects are handled by the company Prime Focus.

The shooting of the drama started on 6 May 2014, in Guangxi, China and was wrapped up on 14 September 2014 in Hengdian World Studios, China. The preliminary work started one and a half years ago, including choosing of outdoor scene locations and building filming sites in scenic spots in Guangxi.

Soundtrack

Reception
Two versions of a three-minute short trailer, one in Chinese and the other dubbed in English, were released online,  receiving more than 280 million views on Weibo and becoming one of the hottest topics on social media. In October 2014, two longer trailers dubbed in both Chinese and English language were released in Cannes, France, and received an overwhelming response.

The drama was a huge commercial success in China, with an average rating of 2.784% (CMS50) and 2.213% (nationwide), becoming the second highest rated drama of 2015. It also became the first Chinese drama to surpass 20 billion online views. A licensed mobile game was also released, and brought in more than 10 million active players and 200 million yuan in revenue in its first two months.

In 2016, The Journey of Flower was featured on the New York Times.

Awards and nominations

International broadcast
  Taiwan - CTi Variety, CTV, KKTV
  Cambodia - Rasmey Hang Meas HDTV
  Vietnam - HTV3, ZingTV, VTV5 Tây Nguyên, BPTV1 (Bình Phước Radio - Television - Newspaper)
  Thailand - PPTV
  Malaysia - 8TV, ntv7
  Singapore - Mediacorp Channel 8

References

External links
 The Journey of Flower's Official Weibo
The Journey of Flower's Facebook

Television series set in the Five Dynasties and Ten Kingdoms period
Chinese romantic fantasy television series
Xianxia television series
2015 Chinese television series debuts
2015 Chinese television series endings
Television shows based on Chinese novels
Television series by Ciwen Media